The women's 10,000 metres event at the 1999 Summer Universiade was held on 8 July at the Estadio Son Moix in Palma de Mallorca, Spain.

Results

References

Athletics at the 1999 Summer Universiade
1999 in women's athletics
1999